Les Gitans is the fourth studio album by French-Italian singer Dalida, released by Barclay Records, catalogue number 80 094, in 1958. In 2002, Sammel released a remastered version in CD and 10" (25 cm) vinyl record (LP), catalogue number 981 109-7. In 2004, Universal Records released a remastered CD, catalogue number 981 108-5, as part of a compilation containing re-releases of all of Dalida's studio albums recorded under the Barclay label.

Track listing 
Barclay – 80 094 Ⓜ, 981 109-7:

Singles 
1958 "Dans le bleu du ciel bleu", also "Volume 9"
1958 "Je pars", also "Volume 10"
1958 "Aïe! Mon cœur", also "Volume 11"
1958 "Les Gitans", also "Volume 12"

See also 
 Dalida albums discography

References

Sources 

Dalida albums
1958 albums
Barclay (record label) albums
French-language albums